Dadzie is a surname. Notable people with the surname include:

Ebenezer Dadzie (born 1975), Ghanaian football striker
Emmanuel Kodjoe Dadzie (1916–1983), Ghanaian diplomat
Francis Dadzie, Ghanaian professional footballer
Gifty Afenyi-Dadzie (born 1957), Ghanaian female journalist and businesswoman
Ken Dadzie, Ghanaian soldier 
Kenneth Dadzie (1930–1995), Ghanaian diplomat
Stella Dadzie (born 1952), British educationalist, activist, writer and historian

See also
John Dadzie, better known by his musical aliases 12th Planet and Infiltrata
Adze
Azie